Murrill Hill is a summit in St. Francois County in the U.S. state of Missouri. The hill lies within a horseshoe bend in Big River about three quarters of a mile west of Desloge.

Murrill Hill has the name of Tom Murrill, the original owner of the site.

References

Landforms of St. Francois County, Missouri
Hills of Missouri